Magsud Davud oghlu Mammadov (born May 30, 1929) is an Azerbaijani ballet dancer, ballet master, People's Artist of the Azerbaijan SSR (1970).

Biography 
Magsud Mammadov was born on May 30, 1929, in Ganja. In 1950, he graduated from the The Bolshoi Theatre Ballet School (Nikolay Tarasov's class). After returning to Baku, he worked as a soloist at the Azerbaijan State Opera and Ballet Theater since 1951.

Magsud Mammadov performed complex particles both in Azerbaijani ballets and world classics with great success. The basis of the artist's creativity is the performance of the characters of Polad ("Maiden Tower", Afrasiyab Badalbeyli), Manzar, Lenny ("Seven Beauties" and "The Path of Thunder", Gara Garayev), Farhad ("Love legend", Arif Malikov), Azad ("Gulshan", Soltan Hajibeyov), Parviz ("Gypsy girl", Ashraf Abbasov), Albert ("Giselle", Adolphe Adam), Desiree, Siegfried, Shahzade ("The Sleeping Beauty", "Swan Lake" and "The Nutcracker" Pyotr Ilyich Tchaikovsky), Li-Chan-Fou and Ma Lichen ("The Red Poppy", Reinhold Glière), Piero ("The Golden Key", Boris Zeidman), Kolen ("Harlequinade", Riccardo Drigo), Vatslav ("The Fountain of Bakhchisarai", Boris Asafyev), Frondoso ("Laurencia", Alexander Krein), Hero ("Chopiniana", Frédéric Chopin), Basil ("Don Quixote", Ludwig Minkus).

The role of Farhad in Arif Malikov's "Love legend" ballet is one of Magsud Mammadov's most successful works. He won the tour of Azerbaijan Opera and Ballet Theater in Monte Carlo, France and Luxembourg.

In 1972–1973, he worked as a ballet master and pedagogue in Algeria.

Magsud Mammadov had been a member of the CPSU since 1979. Magsud Mammadov is the husband of People's Artist Rafiga Akhundova.

On May 21, 1970, he was awarded the title of "People's Artist of the Azerbaijan SSR", and on April 30, 1955, was awarded the honorary title of "Honored Artist of the Azerbaijan SSR". On June 9, 1959, he was awarded the Order of the Red Banner of Labour, and on May 29, 2019, he was awarded the Shohrat Order.

References 

1929 births
Honored Artists of the Azerbaijan SSR
Recipients of the Shohrat Order
Recipients of the Order of the Red Banner of Labour
Azerbaijani ballet masters
Azerbaijani male dancers
Living people